Sociedad Deportiva Juvenil de Ponteareas, is a Spanish football club based in the municipality of Ponteareas. Founded in 1950, they currently play in Tercera División RFEF – Group 1, holding home matches at the Campo Municipal de Pardellas.

History

SD Juvenil was founded on the 17 May 1950 by five young men who had decided to set up a sports club. The club was founded as a Sociedad Deportiva, a sports club competing in various disciplines, most notably football, athletics & roller hockey. The name of the club itself, Juvenil, was chosen as in the 1950s the age of majority was 21 years of age and none of the founders were older than 20.

Founders
 President - Jose Castro Alvarez (Presidente de honor)
 Vicepresident - José Luis Diz
 Secretary - David Díaz Peña
 Treasurer - José Luis Rodríguez Díaz
 Spokesman - Rafael Luis Díaz

Club crest and colours
The club's crest is based on the coat of arms of the municipality of Ponteareas - a lion on the medieval bridge that gives Ponteareas its name (Ponte meaning bridge in Galician) and a church on the left of the crest. The club plays in red shirts, black shorts and red socks.

Season to season

6 seasons in Tercera División
1 season in Tercera División RFEF

References

Football clubs in Galicia (Spain)
Association football clubs established in 1950
1950 establishments in Spain